The ELLE Style Turkish Awards are an awards ceremony hosted annually by ELLE Turkey magazine.

List of award winners

2010
Winners of the ELLE Style Awards 2010 (or originally named: ELLE Style Awards 2010) for the first time in 2010:

Man of the Year: Kıvanç Tatlıtuğ
Woman of the Year: Beren Saat
Model of the Year: Sedef Avcı
Music of the Year (Man): Emre Aydın
Music of the Year (Woman): Şebnem Ferah
Businesswoman of the Year: Ümit Boyner
Businessman of the Year: Rahmi Koç
Style of the Year: Ajda Pekkan
Breakthrough Talent: Taylor Momsen
Outstanding Achievement in Fashion: Christopher Bailey
Lifetime Achievement in Fashion: Salvatore Ferragamo
Hotel of the Year: W Istanbul
Place of the Year: Changa
Photographer of the Year: Koray Birand
Young Fashion Designer of the Year: Zeynep Tosun
Designer of the Year: Hakan Yıldırım
Schwarzkopf Special Award: Güzide Duran

2011

Winners of the ELLE Style Awards 2011 (or originally named: ELLE Style Awards 2011) for the second time in 2011:

Man of the Year: Okan Yalabık
Woman of the Year: Tuba Büyüküstün
Music of the Year (Man): Harun Tekin
Music of the Year (Woman): Sıla
Businesswoman of the Year: Gülden Yilmaz
Businessman of the Year: Akın Öngör
Style of the Year: Nebahat Çehre
Place of the Year: Salt
Jewelry Designer of the Year: Ece Şirin
Photographer of the Year: Ayten Yilmaz
Young Fashion Designer of the Year: Ersöz Ata
Designer of the Year: Arzu Kaprol
Modan's leading blogger: Garance Dore
Idea Leader: Lisa Birnbach
Lifetime Achievement Award: Tommy Hilfiger
Special Award Fashion Vision: Scott Schuman

2012

Winners of the ELLE Style Awards 2012 (or originally named: ELLE Style Awards 2012) for the third time in 2012:

Man of the Year: Mehmet Günsür
Woman of the Year: Demet Evgar
Music of the Year (Man): Murat Boz
Music of the Year (Woman): Nil Karaibrahimgil
Businesswoman of the Year: Oya Eczacıbaşı
Businessman of the Year: Ali Koç
Style of the Year: Burcu Esmersoy
Designer of the Year: Bora Aksu
Young Fashion Designer of the Year: Tolga Turan
Photographer of the Year: Emre Güven
Jewelry Designer of the Year: Nazan Pak & Ela Cindoruk
Place of the Year: Salt Galata
Lifetime Achievement in Jewelry: Leyla Adler
Fashion Visionary: Barbara Bui
International Style Icon: Olivia Palermo
Lifetime Achievement in Fashion La Maison: Sonia Rykiel

2013

Winners of the ELLE Style Awards 2013 (or originally named: ELLE Style Awards 2013) for the fourth time in 2013:

Man of the Year: Burak Özçivit
Woman of the Year: Gülse Birsel
Music of the Year (Man): Yalın
Music of the Year (Woman): Hadise
Businesswoman of the Year: Candan Kıramer
Businessman of the Year: Alican Ulusoy
Style of the Year: Ahu Yağtu
Fashion Designer of the Year: Ayse Ege, Ece Ege & Dice Kayek
Young Fashion Designer of the Year: Serkan Cura
Photographer of the Year: Emre Doğru
Jewelry Designer of the Year: Arman Suciyan
Venue of the Year: Zeugma Mosaic Museum
Innovative Brand of the Year:  Billstore
TV Series of the Year: Intikam
Style Owner's Hair Award of the Year: Serenay Sarikaya
Outstanding Achievement in Fashion:  Cecilia Bönstörm / Zadig & Voltaire
Fashion Visionary: Dean Caten & Dan Caten
Lifetime Achievement in Fashion:  Kean Etro / ETRO
Emerging Designer of the year: Peter Copping & Nina Ricci

2014

Winners of the ELLE Style Awards 2014 (or originally named: ELLE Style Awards 2014) for the fifth time in 2014:

Man of the Year: Çağatay Ulusoy
Woman of the Year: Fahriye Evcen
Music of the Year (Man): Ozan Dogulu
Music of the Year (Woman): Atiye
Businesswoman of the Year: Galya Frayman Molinas
Fashion Designer of the Year: Ayse Ege, Ece Ege & Dice Kayek
Young Fashion Designer of the Year: Hande Mikrak
Designer of the Year: Dilek Hanif
ELLE Icon of the Year: Hande Ataizi Harvey
TV Series of the Year: Medcezir
Sustainable Environment Project: Lipton Sustainable Tea Farming Project
Place of the Year: Baksý Museum
Breakthrough Model Of The Year: Frida Aasen
Blogger Of The Year: Pelayo Diaz
Visionary Instagrammer: Patrick Janelle
Outstanding Achievement In Fashion: Roland Mouret
Fashion Visionary: Zuhair Murad
Lifetime Achievement In Fashion: Angela Missoni

See also

 List of fashion awards

References

External links
 ELLE Style Awards Turkey

Style Awards Turkey
Fashion awards
Turkish awards